Elvira Sakhipzadovna Nabiullina (born 29 October 1963) is a Russian economist and current head of the Central Bank of Russia. She was president Vladimir Putin's economic adviser from May 2012 to June 2013 after serving as the minister of economic development from September 2007 to May 2012. As of 2019, she was listed as the 53rd most powerful woman in the world by Forbes.

Early life and education
Nabiullina was born in Ufa, Bashkir ASSR, on 29 October 1963 into an ethnic Tatar family. Her father, Sakhipzada Saitzadayevich, was a driver, while her mother, Zuleikha Khamatnurovna, was a factory manager. Nabiullina graduated from school No. 31 of Ufa as an excellent pupil. She graduated from Moscow State University in 1986. In subsequent years, she was selected for the 2007 Yale World Fellows program.

Career
Between 1991 and 1994, Nabiullina worked at the USSR Science and Industry Union and its successor, the Russian Union of Industrialists and Entrepreneurs. In 1994, she moved to the Ministry for Economic Development and Trade, where she rose to the level of deputy minister by 1997; she left the ministry in 1998. She spent the next two years with Sberbank as its chief executive and with former Economic Development and Trade Minister Herman Gref's non-governmental think tank, the Center for Strategic Development, before returning to the Ministry for Economic Development and Trade as first deputy in 2000. Between 2003 and her September 2007 appointment as minister, she chaired the Center for Strategic Development as well as an advisory committee preparing for Russia's 2006 presidency of the G8.

Russian President Putin appointed Nabiullina to the post of minister of economic development and trade on 24 September 2007, replacing Gref. She found working with then-deputy premier and finance minister Alexei Kudrin "difficult but always interesting" and remained in that position until 21 May 2012. In 2012 she was one of six senior government figures to accompany Putin back to the Kremlin administration after Putin was elected president of Russia for a third term. From May 2012 to June 2013, she served as Assistant to President Putin for Economic Affairs.

Succeeding Sergey Ignatyev in 2013, Nabiullina was appointed head of the Central Bank of Russia, becoming the second woman after Tatiana Paramonova to hold that position, and thus the first Russian woman in the G8. In May 2014 she was named one of the world's most powerful women by Forbes, which noted that she "has been given the difficult task of managing the ruble exchange rate during Russian military operation in Ukraine and annexation of Crimea and facilitating growth for an economy trying to avoid a recession". In an effort to stop the ruble's slide, the Central Bank of Russia, under her leadership, hiked interest rates, free-floated the exchange rate, and kept a cap on inflation, thus stabilizing the financial system and boosting foreign-investor confidence. Euromoney magazine named her their 2015 Central Bank Governor of the Year.

In 2017, the British magazine The Banker chose Nabiullina as "Central Banker of the Year, Europe".

On 28 February 2022, she gave a speech announcing a number of measures to combat the 2022 Russian financial crisis caused by the Russian invasion of Ukraine, including that the Central Bank of Russia's interest rate would rise to 20%, that the stock market be closed, and that capital controls would be instituted. In March 2022, it was reported that she had attempted to resign her position, only to be ordered to stay in post by Putin. In September 2022, the United States Treasury Department sanctioned Nabiullina.

"Nabiullina’s brooch"
There is a belief in the Russian media that the head of the Central Bank uses brooches at public events to signal the state of the economy and the regulator's plans. In 2020, Nabiullina appeared at press conferences with a brooch of a blue wave, a dot, a tumbler, a stork. In March 2021, when the increase in the refinancing rate was announced for the first time in three years, she appeared with a hawk.

In September 2021, Nabiullina revealed the meaning of the brooches, which represent her own way of communication, an alternate language to "give the market a chance to reflect". Meanwhile, according to Nabiullina, the exact significance of any brooch should remain mysterious and is with rare exceptions ambiguous.

In her speech on 28 February 2022 announcing measures to try and alleviate the 2022 Russian financial crisis, several analysts noted that she wore no brooch. Sergei Guriev of Sciences Po speculated that it "should not be read as she disagreed with Putin’s policy, but as a sign that it is time to bury normal monetary policy," while adding that "I am sure she was not part of the narrow circle making the decision on going to war."

Personal life
In the late 1980s while studying at the graduate school of Moscow State University, Nabiullina married a lecturer there, Yaroslav Kuzminov. Kuzminov became rector of National Research University Higher School of Economics (1994-2021), since July 2021 the academic supervisor of the HSE. They have a son, Vasiliy (born 13 August 1988), at present a Research Fellow at the HSE.

Sanctions
On 19 April 2022, Nabiullina was sanctioned by Australia after the 2022 Russian invasion of Ukraine. On 30 September 2022, after the Russian annexation of southern and eastern Ukraine, she was sanctioned by the United States. She was also sanctioned by New Zealand.

Notes

References

External links

 

1963 births
Living people
1st class Active State Councillors of the Russian Federation
Moscow State University alumni
Politicians from Ufa
Tatar people of Russia
21st-century Russian economists
Economy ministers of Russia
Women government ministers of Russia
United Russia politicians
21st-century Russian politicians
Russian women economists
Presidents of the Central Bank of Russia
21st-century Russian women politicians
Women bankers
Central Bank of Russia
Russian individuals subject to the U.S. Department of the Treasury sanctions